The Rocketeer is a fictional superhero appearing in American comic books originally published by Pacific Comics. Created by writer/artist Dave Stevens, the character first appeared in 1982 and is an homage to the Saturday matinee serial heroes from the 1930s through the 1950s.

The Rocketeer's secret identity is Cliff Secord, a stunt pilot who discovers a mysterious jetpack that allows him to fly. His adventures are set in Los Angeles and New York in 1938, and Stevens gave them a retro, nostalgic feel influenced by the King of the Rocket Men and Commando Cody movie serials (both from Republic Pictures), and pinup diva Bettie Page.

The character was adapted into the 1991 Walt Disney Pictures film The Rocketeer by director Joe Johnston.

Premise
In 1938 Los Angeles, Cliff Secord, a local racing pilot and barnstormer, discovers a rocket pack hidden by two gangsters fleeing the police. When he decides to take it for a spin, his life is turned upside down in more ways than one.

Publication history
The Rocketeer's first adventure appeared in 1982 as a backup feature in issues #2 and #3 of Mike Grell's Starslayer series from Pacific Comics. Two more installments appeared in Pacific's showcase comic Pacific Presents #1 and 2. The fourth chapter ended in a cliffhanger that was later concluded in The Rocketeer Special Edition #1, released by Eclipse Comics in 1984. Eclipse then collected "all 5 action chapters" in volume seven of their Eclipse Graphic Album series, The Rocketeer (1985), featuring an introduction by Harlan Ellison.

On February 28, 2009, IDW Publishing announced a hardcover collecting the entire series, intended to be published in October 2009. Dave Stevens' The Rocketeer: The Complete Adventures contained new coloring by Laura Martin, who had been chosen by Dave Stevens prior to his death.

Following Stevens' death, IDW began publishing additional Rocketeer comics.  In 2011 and 2012, several stories by authors including Jonathan Ross, Kurt Busiek, Mark Waid, and others were collected in Rocketeer Adventures, volumes one and two, edited by Scott Dunbier. Two full length graphic novels, Mark Waid's The Rocketeer: Cargo of Doom and Roger Langridge's The Rocketeer: Hollywood Horror, which was narrated by a version of Groucho Marx, were published in 2013. Finally, in 2014, Waid published another graphic novel linking the Rocketeer with The Spirit in The Rocketeer & the Spirit: Pulp Friction.

In September, 2014, IDW issued The Rocketeer: Jet-Pack Adventures, a prose anthology of ten short stories written by authors including Yvonne Navarro, Don Webb, Gregory Frost, Nancy Holder, Nancy A. Collins. Set between 1939 and 1946, the stories feature appearances by such historic figures as Howard Hughes, Hedy Lamarr, Tarzan's Johnny Weissmuller, and writer Zane Grey.

In January 2023 it was reported that IDW Publishing would be publishing a one-shot anthology, The Rocketeer, which was first conceived by filmmakers Kelvin Mao and Robert Windom when they discovered during production of their documentary, Dave Stevens: Drawn to Perfection, that Danny Bilson and the late Paul De Meo, who wrote the screenplay to the 1991 feature film adaptation The Rocketeer, had written an unpublished Rocketeer comics story, featuring an appearance by real-life aviation pioneer Amelia Earhart. That story would be illustrated by Adam Hughes. The book also includes four-page story of the Rocketeer fighting a Japanese Zero fighter plane in the South Pacific, written by Windom, who described it as "dreamy contemplation on life and love," and drawn by Jae Lee, and a 12-page story written by Mao and drawn by Craig Cermak, of Cliff Secord's date night with Betty, which leads to conflict with "a vaguely familiar adventurer/archeologist".

Background

Allusions
Besides pulp characters, actors of the 1940s and 1950s have also visually inspired two characters: Lothar, the villain in "Cliff's New York Adventure", is based on the likeness of acromegalic horror movie star Rondo Hatton; and Cliff Secord's girlfriend Betty is modeled after "Queen of Pinups" Bettie Page.

A "Rocket Man" character, with a near-identical rocket backpack and similar uniform, appeared in four Republic Pictures movie serials from 1949 through 1953. The fourth serial, originally conceived as a syndicated Republic TV series, was first released under contractual obligation to movie houses as a regular multi-chapter theatrical serial. Two years later, it was re-cut with new footage and additional music added and finally syndicated on NBC television stations as twelve 25-minute episodes. The four Republic Rocket Man serials were: King of the Rocket Men (1949), Radar Men from the Moon (1952), Zombies of the Stratosphere (1952), and Commando Cody: Sky Marshal of the Universe (serial 1953, TV series 1955)

In other media

Film
 Disney produced The Rocketeer in 1991, directed by Joe Johnston, and starring Billy Campbell, Jennifer Connelly, Alan Arkin, Timothy Dalton, Paul Sorvino, and Tiny Ron Taylor. The film was released on June 21, 1991 and received generally favorable reviews from critics.
 In 2012, Disney was reportedly considering a remake of the 1991 film.
 In 2021, It was announced that Jessica and David Oyelowo are producing a revival titled The Return of the Rocketeer. The film will be written by Ed Ricourt in which Oyelowo may possibly star. The story focuses on a retired Tuskegee airman who takes up the Rocketeer mantle.

Television
 A television series was released on November 8, 2019 on Disney Junior in the United States, and on November 10 on Disney Junior in Canada. The series focuses on a young girl named Kit Secord (voiced by Kitana Turnbull) who receives the family jetpack for her birthday and uses it to protect the town of Hughesville from various villains.
 In August 2021, What If...? director Bryan Andrews revealed that Marvel Studios had considered incorporating the Rocketeer into the series, set in the Marvel Cinematic Universe, during the events of series premiere "What If... Captain Carter Were the First Avenger?", in which they would have teamed up with Captain Carter, before deciding against it due to similarities between Howard Stark and Howard Hughes.

Video games
 The first officially licensed Rocketeer game was released for the Nintendo Entertainment System in May 1991. It is a side-scrolling action game published and developed by Bandai, and followed the plot of the film.

Homages

Comic homages
 Eric Canete's cover for Iron Man: Enter the Mandarin #1 pays homage to The Rocketeer film's Art Deco-style theatrical poster.

Reception
IGN listed the Rocketeer as the 76th Greatest Comic Book Character, stating that the Rocketeer taps into that popular desire to fly. IGN also stated the Rocketeer saga remains a compelling one.

References

Bibliography
 Bilson, Danny, Paul De Meo and William Dear. The Rocketeer: Screenplay: S.l. : s.n., dated June 13, 1990.
 Cotta Vaz, Mark and Patricia Rose Duigna. Industrial Light & Magic: Into the Digital Realm. Hong Kong: Del Rey Books, 1996. .
 David, Peter. The Rocketeer Novelization of the Film. New York: Bantam Books, 1991

External links
 
 Dave Stevens official site
 A detailed history of the character in the Wold Newton Universe
 
 Rocketeer at Don Markstein's Toonopedia. Retrieved January 24, 2017. Archived from the original on January 24, 2017.
 Lars of Mars at Don Markstein's Toonopedia. Retrieved September 24, 2012. Archived from the original on October 24, 2015.

1982 comics debuts
American comics adapted into films
Art Deco
aviation comics
Comico Comics characters
Comico Comics titles
comics characters introduced in 1982
comics set in the 1930s
Cultural depictions of the Marx Brothers
Dark Horse Comics superheroes
Dark Horse Comics titles
dieselpunk
Eclipse Comics superheroes
Eclipse Comics titles
fiction set in 1938
fictional aviators
fictional characters from Los Angeles
IDW Publishing characters
IDW Publishing titles
Pacific Comics titles
retrofuturism
superhero film characters
ja:ロケッティア